Indian School of Media (also known as ISM) is a vocational training institute in Mumbai, India.

History
ISM was established in early 2011 and is an initiative by IIT and IIM Ahmedabad alumni. It is owned by a young entrepreneur Ms Natasha Aranha and currently has centers in Mumbai, India.

Academics
1. Post Graduate Diploma in Media & Event Management.

2. Diploma in Media and Event Management.

Indian School of Media is the only institute in Mumbai that offers short term Courses in Event Management.

Industry Interface
Students of Indian School of Media have worked on events like IIFA Awards, Filmfare Awards, MTV Roadies, Apsara Awards, Mumbai Marathon, Indian Telly Awards etc. In November 2015, 30 students of ISM managed the Indian Telly Awards, being responsible for managing production and operations, backstage and front stage, red carpet and security to costumes and celebrity management

References

External links
 Indian School of Media

Communications and media organisations based in India
Schools in Mumbai